Laminacauda suavis is a species of sheet weaver found in Colombia. It was described by Millidge in 1991. It has never been photographed.

References

Linyphiidae
Arthropods of Colombia
Endemic fauna of Colombia
Spiders of South America
Spiders described in 1991